"Seed of Destruction" is the thirteenth episode of the second series of Space: 1999 (and the thirty-seventh episode overall of the programme).  The screenplay was written by John Goldsmith; the director was Kevin Connor.  The final shooting script is dated 25 May 1976. Live action filming took place from Wednesday 7 to Friday 23 July 1976.

Story 
It is 1608 days after leaving Earth orbit, and the Moon is passing a bizarre, jewel-like asteroid.  Resembling a colossal uncut diamond, it radiates an intense energy field disruptive to Moonbase Alpha's sensor equipment.  John Koenig decides a close reconnaissance is in order and lifts off in Eagle One.  On final approach, an area with breathable atmosphere is detected.  Accepting that this invitation could be a trap, he and co-pilot Alan Carter set down within this 'air bubble'.  Opening the hatch, they observe the terrain—a plain of crystalline 'sand' surrounded by iceberg-like crags of solid crystal.

As the two men disembark, they are stopped by a malfunction alarm; a problem has developed in the stabiliser circuits.  Carter remains behind to troubleshoot as the Commander explores.  He discovers a cave and opts to go in alone.  The interior is akin to a vast hall of mirrors and he is dazzled by endless reflections.  The mirrors are not glass, but facets of dense crystal.  Checking in with Carter, Koenig speculates this could be the source of the energy field.  Moving further into the cavern, he is briefly overwhelmed by a high-frequency keening.  He recovers and moves on.  The viewer sees that one mirror has retained his reflection...which then steps out from the crystal with a wolfish smile.

Koenig pauses to collect a sample.  Chipping at the wall, he feels an unexpected hand on his shoulder, turns—and beholds the doppelgänger.  Before the Commander can react, the reflection-imposter renders him unconscious with an energy shock.  After ripping the crystal sample from the wall and stowing it in Koenig's sample case, the replica appropriates his commlock and orders Carter to prepare for lift-off.  Before leaving, it removes its mirror-image jacket and dons Koenig's.  As it boards the Eagle, Carter notes the mysterious malfunction has resolved itself.  Maya calls, requesting they postpone lift-off for her to get further readings from their sensors.  The replica brusquely refuses and they depart.

Arriving on Alpha, the Koenig-replica makes a base-wide announcement.  It states the Moon is surrounded by an energy screen which will soon render all their instruments useless.  The solution is to project a powerful energy beam at the asteroid, which will be reflected back by its mirror-like composition.  The beam will cut through the energy screen, thus freeing them.  For the desired effect, the beam will require nearly all of their generated power over an extended period.  The staff readily accepts this tissue of lies, with the exception of Maya.

The scientific officer questions the replica's analysis, asking to see its data.  When it refuses, the Psychon woman persists until, in a fit of rage, the replica confines her to quarters.  Wielding an iron fist, the imposter then issues orders to construct the energy projector its scheme requires.  Pointedly avoiding Helena Russell, it leaves to personally oversee the project.  Afterwards, the senior executives confer.  Concerned by his uncharacteristic, almost martinet-like behaviour, Helena wonders if 'Koenig' has been possessed by an alien life-form.  Carter, though, speculates 'the Commander' has knowledge of a greater danger, but is choosing to conceal it from them.

Later, Tony Verdeschi visits his 'mutineer' girlfriend to raise her spirits.  Maya is deeply concerned over the dearth of information on this crisis.  As a metamorph, she is hypersensitive to living matter; she sensed a coldness in 'Koenig'—especially when Helena tried to touch him.  Suspecting an alien influence, Verdeschi suggests hijacking an Eagle for an illicit trip to the asteroid.  The security chief then stops, realising he is proposing an act of mutiny against a commanding officer who could well be in full control of his faculties.

The replica's plans for the energy transfer progress.  While Helena frets over the effects of the power reduction on the life-support systems, she is approached by Verdeschi.  They first discuss the replica's disturbing new policies—curfews and sentries standing watch everywhere.  He then asks the tough question:  does the change in 'Koenig' indicate he is mentally incompetent and, if so, how can they stop him?  Helena's devotion to Koenig will not allow her to accept this possibility without solid evidence; she refuses to participate in Verdeschi's conspiracy.

On the asteroid, the real Koenig regains consciousness.  He slips into the discarded jacket, realising it is backward.  Searching the labyrinth for an exit, he hears the high-pitched keening—then a voice, informing him he is a prisoner of Kalthon.  It relates how its civilisation was destroyed when a black sun formed in this galaxy and began absorbing all energy from the nearby solar systems.  Before the end, a 'seed' was prepared and launched into space.  This asteroid, the Heart of Kalthon, contains the remnants of their world suspended in microcosm—cities, people, animal and vegetable life—awaiting regeneration.  With the energy about to be stolen from the Alphans, that process will commence.  Programmed to survive, the intelligence is completely amoral.

The Koenig-reflection isolates itself in the Moonbase observatory.  From the room's expansive windows, it impatiently watches the assembly of the energy reflector's huge parabolic dish.  When moving to caress the crystal sample brought from the asteroid, it is interrupted by Helena.   She wants to talk, questioning his recent harsh behaviour.  Temper flaring, the replica blames the stress of the current crisis.  Asserting her authority, the doctor coolly states that its exposure to an alien environment, coupled with its sudden personality change, is cause for a medical exam.

An argument ensues, during which she grasps its hand—and is shocked by the rigid iciness of its skin.  Seeing her reaction, the replica changes tactics and pours on the charm to appease her, further shocking her by addressing her as 'Doctor Russell'.  Convinced this is not the man she loves, Helena seeks out Maya and Verdeschi and recounts the incident.  Maya knows the answer lies in the alien crystal.  Using her abilities, the metamorph masquerades as one of the senior technicians working on the energy-transfer project, gains access to the observatory while the replica is absent, and steals a small portion of the crystal.

Using equipment smuggled into her quarters, Maya discovers the 'crystal' is a hyper-dense form of living matter, drained of energy—not dead, but dormant, like a seed.  What reaction this substance would have on a human is unknown, but Maya speculates 'Koenig' may no longer be flesh and blood.  On the asteroid, the Kalthon intelligence torments Koenig with mocking laughter and a whirling kaleidoscope of reflections.  Attempting to escape, he shoots a mirror and steps through the empty frame into a passage beyond.  But the crystal reforms around him, trapping him like an insect in amber.

Maya continues her assessment; using a sonarscope, she bombards the sample with sound waves, determining the frequency required to shatter it.  During this, Verdeschi reveals their suspicions to Carter.  Maya cites Helena's testimony regarding the inhuman texture of the replica's skin.  The loyal astronaut refuses to believe; he clings to his theory that this turmoil is over a further threat the replica is keeping secret.  Verdeschi presses him for access to an Eagle—a trip to the asteroid may be the only way to help Koenig.  Carter denounces this kind of 'help' as mutiny and storms off.

The reflector is complete and the power transfer is initiated.  As the energy beam is projected at the asteroid, power levels plunge throughout the base.  Helena reports that life-support is failing in two sections—if power is reduced further, some people may die.  The replica's response is chilling:  Some people are not all the people.'  Meanwhile, Verdeschi and Maya steer through the darkened corridors and board a travel tube.  Arriving at the launch pad with the stand-by Eagle, they are confronted by the sentry on duty.  Distracting him with a Maya-transformed creature, Verdeschi clobbers the guard with a karate chop and they board the ship.

Their unauthorised lift-off is soon reported to the replica.  Enraged, it demands the craft be shot down.  Appalled, Carter stalls off activating the laser batteries.  Arriving at Command Centre, the replica is livid to find Eagle One intact.  It moves to fire the laser itself—to be stopped by Helena when she points out that the weapon will divert power from the energy beam.

She then reveals that this 'Koenig' is an impostor.  Feigning shock and vulnerability, the replica 'admits' being affected by an alien influence on the asteroid—and only by breaking the energy screen can it be freed.  Helena's argument makes her appear hysterical, and the replica threatens her with psychiatric evaluation.  With no support from the others, she is forced into silence.  During this, Verdeschi and Maya set down on the now-pulsing asteroid, horrified by its slow conversion into organic material.

Entering the cave, they encounter a mirror displaying a sourceless reflection of Koenig.  Maya quickly surmises this is the real Koenig; the thing on Alpha must have taken substance from his reflection.  When brute force fails, they use a laser to shatter Koenig's crystal prison.  The three exchange information and formulate a plan:  Koenig will fly to Moonbase to deal with the impostor while Verdeschi and Maya destroy the Heart of Kalthon.  Maya programmes their commlocks to emit the crystal-shattering frequency; before much damage can be done, the gloating intelligence immobilises the pair within the confines of a solid crystal cube.

On Alpha, the Koenig-replica orders the energy flow increased.  Suffering in the intensifying cold, the personnel helplessly watch vital systems fail at random.  The food production and recycling plants cease functioning, and both the water supply and hydroponic farms are frozen.  When the oxygen units fail, Helena implores Carter to defy the impostor.  The astronaut tries to reason with what he still believes is his commander, but is mercilessly ordered to further strengthen the energy beam.  The order is instantly countermanded as the real Koenig enters the room.

When Koenig reveals Kalthon's true motives, the impostor accuses him of being an 'image-creature' sent to prevent their escape. The real Koenig appeals to his lover, reminding Helena that the Koenig-replica could never truly know the depth of their relationship.  Helena has no doubt who is the impostor, and Carter finally sees the truth.  Rallying, the replica cunningly cites the real Koenig's mirror-image jacket as proof he is the impostor.  Koenig counters that, while the replica traded jackets, it did nothing to correct the reversed part in its hair.

Carter shoots the impostor—but the laser has no effect.  It smirks triumphantly, declaring Kalthon will live.  Koenig then plays the shrill sonar frequency.  The replica screams as its body crazes with cracks, then shatters into fragments.  The energy transfer is ended.  With its agent destroyed and the energy flow terminated, the Heart of Kalthon begins to die.  The crystal mirrors spontaneously disintegrate—including those imprisoning Maya and Verdeschi, and they step free from the remnants of their cell.  On Moonbase, the Alphans silently stare at the heap of crystal dust...

Cast

Starring 
Martin Landau — Commander John Koenig
Barbara Bain — Doctor Helena Russell

Also starring 
Catherine Schell — Maya

Featuring 
Tony Anholt — Tony Verdeschi
Nick Tate — Captain Alan Carter
Zienia Merton — Sandra Benes

Also featuring 
Jeffery Kissoon — Doctor Ben Vincent
 Martha Nairn — Joanna Cranston 
 Jack Klaff — Launch Pad Security Guard
 James Leith — Observatory Security Guard
 Albin Pahernik — Maya/Space Animal

Uncredited artists 
 Robert Reeves — Peter
 Pam Rose — Command Centre Operative

Music 
The score was re-edited from previous Space: 1999 incidental music tracks composed for the second series by Derek Wadsworth and draws primarily from the scores of "The Exiles" and "One Moment of Humanity".

Production notes 
 This episode would see the final revamping of the cavern set-pieces initially built for the season-opener, "The Metamorph".  Painted turquoise and covered with glitter for this outing, the money-saving caves had appeared in nine previous episodes ("The Metamorph", "The Exiles", "One Moment of Humanity", "All That Glisters", "Journey to Where", "The Mark of Archanon", "New Adam, New Eve", "Catacombs of the Moon" and "The AB Chrysalis").  The angled windows of the observatory had been used during the first series on the balcony of the Main Mission set.
 Writer John Goldsmith had conceived of the Koenig-replica being much more alien in nature, its eyes flaring with white light and able to paralyse and control humans with a touch. The idea of its appearance being a literal reflection and this fact becoming an integral part of the plot was added by producer Fred Freiberger.  The transformation of the crystal was initially more visually dramatic:  a green, pulsing glow with 'crimson veins' and perceived 'amoebal shapes wriggling and twisting'.
 Deviations from the final shooting script included: (1) The status-report date was originally cited as 508 days; this was adjusted in post production; (2) Yasko was to have appeared in the episode instead of Sahn; (3) During the energy transfer, the crystal sample in Maya's quarters was to be seen regenerating in harmony with the asteroid in a scene cut for time; (4) The original epilogue was also cut, which saw the Alphans launch the remaining crystal sample into space, giving the Kalthon race another chance at life—now that the amoral intelligence was destroyed.
 Martin Landau emphatically believed his left profile was superior to his right and was notorious for insisting any scene he appeared in be set up to capture him only from this side.  Director Kevin Connor recalls, in this episode, Landau allowed himself to be filmed in right profile—provided he was playing his evil replica at the time.

Novelisation 
The episode was adapted in the third Year Two Space: 1999 novel The Space-Jackers by Michael Butterworth published in 1977.  Butterworth would integrate ideas seen in earlier-draft scripts into this adaptation.  Before the energy transfer, Kalthon was passively draining power from Alpha, causing reduced heating and equipment malfunctions.  The scene where Maya and company observe her crystal sample transforming was retained, and a new epilogue showing she and Verdeschi being rescued from the disintegrating asteroid was added.

2015 Reversion 
In 2015, Network Distributing in the UK created a special re-version of the episode into Season 1 format, which was premiered at the Andercon 2015 convention on 13 June. This one-off experiment had a newly edited Barry Gray score (in place of Derek Wadsworth's music) and season 1 style opening credits complete with a 'This Episode' montage of shots. It was later featured on Network's Season 2 blu-ray release with reaction varying from extremely positive, with some reviewers citing an improvement over the original, to underwhelming.

References

External links 
Space: 1999 - "Seed of Destruction" - The Catacombs episode guide
Space: 1999 - "Seed of Destruction" Reversion - Catacombs episode guide
Space: 1999 - "Seed of Destruction" - Moonbase Alpha's Space: 1999 Page

1976 British television episodes
Space: 1999 episodes